Genetically modified food crops were introduced into Ghana in 2013. GM crops are controversial around the world for various reasons and Ghana is no exception. Groups against its introduction include: Food Sovereignty Ghana, The Coalition For Farmer’s Rights, Advocacy Against GMOs, Ghana Catholic Bishops’ Conference, and the Convention People’s Party.  They argue that genetically modified food is not conducive to good health, and is neo-colonialist in nature. That is, it hands control of the food supply to rich nations, which threatens food sovereignty and the national interest,

Proponents argue that GM crops, engineered to resist common pests, increase yield, and hence lead to rising incomes for farmers and the country in general.

Ghana's 2011 Biosafety Act 831 permitted the introduction of genetically modified (GM) foods,  and by 2014, “confined field trials” of GM rice and cowpea in the Ashanti region, and cotton in the 3 northern regions of the country were underway.  In 2015, a temporary injunction on any further GMO commercialization and development was put in place until the conclusion of the case brought by Food Sovereignty Ghana against the Ministry of Food and Agriculture. The trial has been severely protracted, and testimonies from Jonathan Latham (of the Bioscience Resource Project) and TestBioTech took place in March and April 2022. Commercialization of Bt Cowpea is thus still pending approval, although imports of genetically engineered products to Ghana are still allowed.

History of GMOs in Ghana
The National Seed Trade Association of Ghana (NASTAG) publicly advocates for the inclusion of GM seeds in Ghana to aid agricultural development and to mitigate the effects of climate change. NASTAG states that the use of GM seeds in this West Africa country will reduce the number of pesticides and time it takes for farmers to spray. In 2011, the Biosafety Act passed in Ghana, permitting the Council for Scientific and Industrial Research (CSIR) to conduct trials of specific GMOs. It is estimated that genetically modified cowpea, a GMO the CSIR has been experimenting with, will be on the market in Ghana in 2019. 

In late 2017, the minister of Environment, Science, Technology, and Innovation, Professor Kwabena Frimpong-Boateng, advocated for the people of Ghana to be educated on GM seeds and GMO products. Frimpong-Boateng believed that if the public knew more about GMO products they would be more likely to accept and understand the importance of GMOs in assisting Ghana's economy and development.  

In concurrence with the Frimpong-Boateng campaign for public education on GMO inclusion, Food Sovereignty Ghana filled suit against the National Biosafety Authority Board for its plans to proceed with the introduction of GM products on the local market.

Plant Breeders Right Bill controversy
The Ghanaian Parliament is currently considering a bill that would protect the rights of scientists and corporations in relation to the creation of seeds or crops developed for Ghana. If passed, this bill could make Ghana dependent on certified seeds invented by MNCs and other GM seed producers, thus surrendering Ghana's food sovereignty to individuals and organizations. Activists believe this could hinder local farmers and cause local economic problems.

Pro Plant Breeders Right Bill opinions have indicated that GMOs and the bill are unrelated. Dr. Margaret Ottah Atikpo, head of the microbiology division of the Food Research Institute stated, "[The Bill] protects the breeders and brings royalty to the breeder and the country."

Food sovereignty 
Food sovereignty refers to the inherent right of all countries and their people to have control over food production, and also recognizes the political and economic aspects of the agriculture industry. The importance of food sovereignty for a country began to be acknowledged after numerous citizens in developing countries faced the World Food Price Crisis in 2007 and 2008. One of the most significant arguments among activists against the incorporation of GMO products is the impact they have on the food sovereignty of local communities through the monopolization of seeds and the domination of their agriculture industry. The control over the agricultural seed industry by MNCs contains risks for Ghana's food sovereignty by potentially increasing the income disparity between the farmers in Ghana, and the MNCs profiting from use of their GM seeds.

References

Agriculture in Ghana
Genetically modified organisms in agriculture
Controversies in Ghana